Liljeroth is a Swedish language surname.

List of people with the surname 

 Aurora Liljenroth (1772–1836), Swedish academic and scholar
 Leif Liljeroth (1924–2018), Swedish film actor
 Lena Adelsohn Liljeroth (born 1955), Swedish politician
 Tone Liljeroth (born 1975), Norwegian politician

See also 
 Roth (surname)

Surnames of Swedish origin
Swedish-language surnames